Translocon-associated protein subunit beta also known as TRAP-beta is a protein that in humans is encoded by the SSR2 gene.

Function 

The signal sequence receptor (SSR) is a glycosylated endoplasmic reticulum (ER) membrane receptor associated with protein translocation across the ER membrane. The SSR consists of 2 subunits, a 34-kD glycoprotein (alpha-SSR or SSR1) and a 22-kD glycoprotein (beta-SSR or SSR2). The human beta-signal sequence receptor gene (SSR2) maps to chromosome bands 1q21-q23.

References

Further reading